The Registry of Research Data Repositories (re3data.org) is an open science tool that offers researchers, funding organizations, libraries and publishers an overview of existing international repositories for research data.

Background 

re3data.org is a global registry of research data repositories from all academic disciplines. It provides an overview of existing research data repositories in order to help researchers to identify a suitable repository for their data and thus comply with requirements set out in data policies.
The registry was officially launched in May 2013.

Content 

In July 2019 the registry lists 2361 research data repositories from around the world covering all academic disciplines. They are described in detail using the re3data.org schema.
The service makes all metadata in the registry available for open use under the Creative Commons deed CC0.

Features 

The majority of the listed research data repositories are described in detail by a comprehensive schema, namely the re3data.org Schema for the Description of Research Data Repositories.
Information icons support researchers to identify an adequate repository for the storage and reuse of their data.

Inclusion criteria 

A repository is indexed when the minimum requirements for inclusion in re3data.org are met: the repository has to be run by a legal entity, such as a sustainable institution (e.g. library, university) and clearly state access conditions to the data and repository as well as the terms of use. Additionally, an English graphical user interface (GUI) plus a focus on research data is needed.

Partners and cooperation 

re3data.org is now a regular service of DataCite. It has been a joint project of the Berlin School of Library and Information Science, the GFZ German Research Centre for Geosciences and the Library of the Karlsruhe Institute of Technology (KIT). The project has been funded by the German Research Foundation (DFG).
The project cooperates with other Open Science initiatives like Databib, BioSharing, DataCite and OpenAIRE. Several publishers, research institutions and funders refer to re3data.org in their Editorial Policies and guidelines as a tool for the identification of suitable data repositories, e.g. Nature, Springer and the European Commission.

See also 

Data curation
Data sharing
Scientific data archiving

References

External links 
 Official website

Academic publishing
Electronic documents
Identifiers
Index (publishing)
Open science